Renato Del Frate (1910–1962) was an Italian cinematographer who worked on more than fifty films during his career including Carmen (1954).

Selected filmography
 Sentinels of Bronze (1937)
 Cardinal Messias (1939)
 The Marquis of Ruvolito (1939)
 The Carnival of Venice (1939)
 The Palace on the River (1940)
 The Taming of the Shrew (1942)
 The Woman of Sin (1942)
 Lost in the Dark (1947)
 Baron Carlo Mazza (1948)
 The Crossroads (1951)
 The Piano Tuner Has Arrived (1952)
 Carmen (1954)
 It Happened at the Police Station (1954)
 The Lost City (1955)
 Rommel's Treasure (1955)

References

Bibliography 
 Ann Davies & Phil Powrie Carmen on Screen: An Annotated Filmography and Bibliography. Tamesis Books, 2006.

External links 
 

1910 births
1962 deaths
Italian cinematographers
Film people from Rome